Maria Valcheva Bakalova (born 4 June 1996) is a Bulgarian actress. She is the recipient of various accolades, including a Critics' Choice Award, in addition to nominations for an Academy Award, a British Academy Film Award, a Golden Globe Award and a Screen Actors Guild Award.

Born and raised in Burgas, Bakalova began her career in Bulgarian cinema by starring in film productions while attending the National Academy for Theatre and Film Arts in Sofia. She mostly portrayed dramatic roles in films such as Transgression (2017), The Father (2019), Last Call (2020) and Women Do Cry (2021). Bakalova rose to prominence after starring as Tutar Sagdiyev in the 2020 mockumentary Borat Subsequent Moviefilm. Her performance in the film earned her a nomination for an Academy Award, a first for a Bulgarian actress. She subsequently had starring roles in the comedy The Bubble (2022), the slasher film Bodies Bodies Bodies (2022) and the coming-of-age drama Fairyland (2023).

Life and career

1996–2020: Early life and career beginnings
Maria Valcheva Bakalova was born on 4 June 1996 in Burgas to Rumyana Bakalova and Valcho Bakalov. She began taking singing lessons and playing the flute around age six. Bakalova enrolled in acting classes at the age of 12, majoring in drama theater and minoring in flute at the National School of Music and Stage Arts in Burgas, where she was a straight A student; she recalled, "I was a super-disciplined child. I was reading too many books. I was obsessed with Dostoyevsky, at like 15, 16." As a teenager, Bakalova developed an interest in literature, especially the works of Gabriel García Márquez, Jorge Luis Borges and Mikhail Bulgakov, as a method of escapism. She was inspired to pursue film acting after watching The Hunt, and has cited filmmaker Thomas Vinterberg as her biggest influence alongside Susanne Bier, Pedro Almodóvar, Paolo Sorrentino and Andrea Arnold as other major influences.

Bakalova later moved to Sofia where she majored in drama at the National Academy for Theatre and Film Arts. As a student, she appeared in various stage productions, including Les Liaisons dangereuses, Sexual Perversity in Chicago, Kennedy's Children and The Trial. Bakalova made her on-screen debut playing a supporting part in the 2017 comedy-drama film XIIa. In the same year, she made her first headlining appearance in Transgression, where she played Yana, a young girl who has an unusual relationship with an aging rock musician. She secured the role after a classmate of hers signed her up for a blind audition during her first year at university. The film was screened at several film festivals in Europe and North America, before being released through HBO Max in 2021. In 2018, Bakalova won the award for Best Actress at Toronto's Alternative Film Festival for her performance.

In her third year of studies, she volunteered to help filmmakers Kristina Grozeva and Petar Valchanov, who taught the only film acting class at the academy, with scheduling and other tasks, and traveled with them to the set of a film they were working on so that she could watch how they worked and learn from them. One of the directors invited her to audition for a bit in their film The Father (2019); she landed the part and filmed a brief flashback scene as the young version of one of the characters. The Father won the Crystal Globe award for Best Film at the 54th Karlovy Vary International Film Festival, and was selected as the Bulgarian entry for the Best International Feature Film category at the 93rd Academy Awards.

Driven by her fascination with Danish cinema—particularly with the work of Vinterberg, Lars von Trier and their Dogme 95 movement—Bakalova convinced her parents to take her on a trip to Denmark a few months before graduating. There, she visited Zentropa's headquarters, and asked if she could become a P.A. or a runner on von Trier's next film; she was told that she would have to learn Danish, which she agreed to do. She then began studying the language, before graduating with a Bachelor of Arts degree and moving to Los Angeles in 2019. Bakalova next starred in the 2020 comedy-drama Last Call as Alexandra, a suicidal girl who is on the verge of ending her life. Her performance was received positively by critics, and Yanko Terziev of Capital wrote that her portrayal of the character brought "warmth and lyricism" to the film.

2020–present: Hollywood breakthrough
In 2020, Bakalova portrayed Tutar Sagdiyev, the daughter of fictional Kazakh reporter Borat Sagdiyev, in the mockumentary Borat Subsequent Moviefilm alongside Sacha Baron Cohen. Although she was initially credited as Irina Nowak, reports later revealed her involvement. During the audition process, Bakalova had to travel to London for a callback; the secrecy around the project made her concerned that she might have become part of a human trafficking scheme. The film was lauded as "the most impactful piece of political entertainment" in the weeks leading up to the 2020 United States presidential election as a scene in which Rudy Giuliani appears to put his hands down his trousers while reclining on a bed in the presence of Bakalova's character garnered significant media attention. Critics praised her performance, with some stating it was among the year's best. Matt Fowler of IGN noted that "the film's fantastic find, Maria Bakalova, every bit Sacha Baron Cohen's on-screen equal, is who, and what, most people will be talking about." Los Angeles Times film critic Justin Chang described her performance as "terrific," praising her portrayal of her character's journey "with madcap energy and touching conviction." For her performance, Bakalova received several awards, including the Critics' Choice Movie Award for Best Supporting Actress. She was also nominated for Best Supporting Actress at the Academy Awards, BAFTA Awards, and Screen Actors Guild Awards, and for Best Actress in a Motion Picture Comedy or Musical at the Golden Globe Awards. She became the first Bulgarian actress to be nominated for these awards.

Bakalova next starred as Sonja, a 19-year-old girl who discovers she is HIV positive and is in denial about her need for treatment, in Women Do Cry (2021), directed by Mina Mileva and Vesela Kazakova. The film premiered to positive reviews from critics at the 2021 Cannes Film Festival, where it competed in the Un Certain Regard section, and received a Queer Palm nomination. The same year, Bakalova joined the Academy of Motion Picture Arts and Sciences as a member of the Actors Branch.

In 2022, she starred alongside Amandla Stenberg and Pete Davidson in A24's horror film Bodies Bodies Bodies. The film received predominantly favorable reviews; writing for the New York Post, Johnny Oleksinski described Bakalova's performance as "subtle and relatable with a hint of darkness," adding that she "[proved] there's a lot more she can do than trick Southerners," while others felt that her comedic talents were wasted by playing a serious character. Her next role was in Judd Apatow's The Bubble (2022), part of an ensemble cast that included Karen Gillan, David Duchovny, Leslie Mann and Pedro Pascal. The film generated mostly negative reviews, and New York Times critic Ben Kenigsberg wrote that it "underused" Bakalova. After voicing Cosmo the Spacedog in The Guardians of the Galaxy Holiday Special (2022), she starred in the romantic comedy The Honeymoon (2022), which marked her first production venture. The film saw her play Sarah, whose honeymoon is ruined by her husband's best friend and who is pursued by Lucas Bravo's character.

Bakalova next appeared in Andrew Durham's directorial debut Fairyland (2023), which premiered at the 2023 Sundance Film Festival. She will reprise her role as Cosmo the Spacedog in the Marvel Cinematic Universe superhero film Guardians of the Galaxy Vol. 3.

Bakalova is slated to make a cameo appearance in Unfrosted: The Pop-Tart Story. She is also attached to star opposite Alex Pettyfer in the true crime film Branded, based on an article by David Grann for The New Yorker about the origins and expansion of the Aryan Brotherhood.  Bakalova will co-produce and lead Kristina Grozeva and Petar Valchanov's Triumph, and star in Electra alongside Daryl Wein, Jack Farthing and Abigail Cowen. In November 2022, she joined the cast of the action thriller film Dirty Angels, directed by Martin Campbell. She will also star in Madeleine Sackler's sci-fi comedy drama O Horizon.

Public image
In 2020, Variety included Bakalova in their "10 Actors to Watch" list, while The New York Times named her as one of 2020's breakout stars. Since 2021, she has worked closely with Louis Vuitton's creative director Nicolas Ghesquière. In 2021, she appeared on two of Forbes magazine's annual 30 Under 30 lists, which recognise the 30 most influential people in Europe under the age of 30. The same year, W featured her in their annual "Best Performances" issue, and Variety named her among the women who have made an impact on the global entertainment industry. Bakalova has topped Forbes Bulgaria "Top 70 Bulgarian Celebrities" list twice.

Bakalova is an advocate for Bulgarian and Eastern European representation in Hollywood. She is the co-founder of the production company Five Oceans, which aims to bring Bulgarian, Balkan and Slavic stories to international audiences, alongside Julian Kostov. At the 27th Critics' Choice Awards, Bakalova voiced her support for Ukraine, and called for "a new era of cultural and artistic exchange between Eastern Europe and Hollywood".

Filmography

Film

Television

Awards and nominations

Bakalova is the recipient of a Critics' Choice Movie Award for Best Supporting Actress for her performance in Borat Subsequent Moviefilm (2020). She has been nominated for Best Supporting Actress at the Academy Awards, BAFTA Awards, and Screen Actors Guild Awards, and for Best Actress in a Motion Picture Comedy or Musical at the Golden Globe Awards, also for her performance in Borat Subsequent Moviefilm (2020).

See also
 List of Bulgarian Academy Award winners and nominees
 List of European Academy Award winners and nominees

Notes

References

Citations

Bibliography

External links
 
 
 

1996 births
Living people
Actors from Burgas
21st-century Bulgarian actresses
Bulgarian film actresses
Bulgarian television actresses
Bulgarian stage actresses
Bulgarian company founders
National Academy for Theatre and Film Arts alumni
Bulgarian expatriates in the United States